The St Mark Passion, BWV 247, is a lost Passion setting by Johann Sebastian Bach, first performed in Leipzig on Good Friday, 23 March 1731 and again, in a revised version, in 1744. Though Bach's music is lost, the libretto by Picander is still extant, and from this, the work can to some degree be reconstructed.

History 

Unlike Bach's earlier existing passions (St John Passion and St Matthew Passion), the Markus-Passion is probably a parody—it recycles previous works. The St Mark Passion seems to reuse virtually the whole of the Trauer Ode Laß, Fürstin, laß noch einen Strahl, BWV 198, along with the two arias from Widerstehe doch der Sünde, BWV 54. In addition, two choruses from the St Mark Passion were reused in the Christmas Oratorio. This leaves only a couple of missing arias, which are taken from other Bach works when reconstructions are attempted. However, since Bach's recitative is lost, most reconstructions use the recitatives composed for a Markus-Passion attributed to Reinhard Keiser, a work which Bach himself performed on at least two occasions, which gives a certain authenticity to things, although it could be viewed as somewhat disrespectful to Keiser's work. However, Keiser's setting starts slightly later than Bach's, which requires a small amount of composition on the part of the reconstructor.

Bach's St. Mark Passion was first performed in Leipzig on Good Friday, 23 March 1731.  Written under the pseudonym Picander, Christian Friedrich Henrici's libretto survives in a 1732 poetry collection. The Markus-Passion is a modest setting, adding to Mark chapters 14 and 15 only eight free verse arias and 16 hymn stanzas. The chorales assume greater weight owing to their higher proportional use: 16 of the 46 movements are chorales in the St Mark Passion, whereas only 13 of 68 numbers are chorales in the St Matthew Passion. Five of the Markus-Passion texts appear to match the 1727 Trauer Ode, other likely parodies include BWV 54 and BWV 120a. However, no musical material remains for the Gospel texts or turba choruses. Further, we have no knowledge of the keys and orchestration which Bach used. While the libretto specifies which chorale melodies were used, Bach's harmonizations remain uncertain.

Structure 
According to Bach Digital, the Passion was scored for SATB singers, two traversos, two oboes, two oboes d'amore, a string section consisting of two violin parts and two viola parts, organ and continuo, possibly complemented by two violas da gamba and two lutes.

Gospel parts

BWV 247 contains the text of the entire chapters 14 and 15 of the Gospel of Mark, sung as recitatives, and turba choruses.

Recitatives

Turba choruses

Chorales

Free poetry

Opening and closing choral movements

Arias

Reconstructed versions

Hellmann (1964) – Koch (1999)
Diethard Hellmann completed a reconstruction in 1964 based on parodies and chorale harmonization choices only. The English premiere took place in Oxford, July 1965. A 1976 edition includes additional choruses to be used with a spoken delivery of the gospel text. Carus-Verlag published Hellmann's work with newly composed recitatives and arias by Johannes Koch in 1999. The orchestration for the work matches that of BWV 198.

Recordings:
 Wolfgang Gönnenwein, South German Madrigal Choir (Stuttgart), Pforzheim Chamber Orchestra (Erato, 1965; later [1972?] Musical Heritage Society; LC 72-751034)
 Bongiovanni GB 2024/25-2 (recorded 1984)
 In 2009 a performance and live recording of the reconstructed version by Diethard Hellmann and Andreas Glöckner, in the Frauenkirche Dresden with the augmented ensemble Amarcord and the Kölner Akademie was conducted by Michael Alexander Willens. The lost recitatives were replaced by recitation.

Heighes (1995)
Simon Heighes's reconstruction was completed in 1995.

Recordings:
 Jörg Breiding for Rondeau
 A recording of Simon Heighes's reconstruction was made by the European Union Baroque Orchestra with the Ring Ensemble of Finland conducted by Roy Goodman. Rogers Covey-Crump EVANGELIST, Gordon Jones JESUS, Connor Burrowes treble, David James alto, Paul Agnew tenor, and Teppo Tolonen baritone. It was published by Brilliant Classics, recorded 25–30 March 1996 in the Chapel of New College, Oxford.

Gomme (1997)
Andor Gomme edited a 1997 reconstruction published by Bärenreiter that utilizes BWV 198 and choruses from BWV 204, 216, 120a, and 54.  The recitatives and turba choruses are drawn from a St Mark Passion traditionally attributed to Reinhard Keiser (1674–1739), which Bach himself adapted for use in Weimar in 1713.

Recording:
 A recording of Gomme's reconstruction was made in 1998 by the Choir of Gonville & Caius College and the Cambridge Baroque Camerata, led by Geoffrey Webber. The recording was issued in 1999 by ASV.

Kelber (1998)
In 1998 Rudolf Kelber reconstructed the St Mark Passion as a pasticcio: he completed Bach's fragments using arias from cantatas by Bach, recitatives by Keiser, motives by Telemann and his own additions.

Koopman (1999)
In 1999, Ton Koopman presented a reconstruction that does not utilize BWV 198, but instead draws on Es ist nichts Gesundes an meinem Leibe, BWV 25 (opening chorus) and Siehe zu, daß deine Gottesfurcht nicht Heuchelei sei, BWV 179 (turba choruses) and his own freely composed recitatives.

Recordings conducted by Ton Koopman:
 Erato 8573-80221-2 (recorded 1999, issued 2000)
 CCDVD 72141 (DVD: live recording 2000, issued 2005)

Boysen (2010)
In 2010, harpsichordist and conductor Jörn Boysen made a new version utilizing choruses and arias from BWV 198 and an aria from BWV 54. He composed all missing recitatives, turba choirs and one aria. This version has been performed in the Netherlands and Germany in 2011 and 2012.

Grychtolik (2010)
In 2010, Alexander Ferdinand Grychtolik made a first edition of the late version of the St Mark Passion (from 1744) as a stylistically consistent reconstruction, published by Edition Peters. The text of this unknown later version was discovered in 2009 in Saint Petersburg. In this version, Bach added two arias and he made small changes in Picander's  text.

Eichelberger (2015)
In 2015, Organist Freddy Eichelberger offered a second reconstruction of the 1744 version based on the BWV 198 and composed all missing recitatives, turba choirs and some chorals. This version was written in collaboration with the musicologist Laurent Guillo, the editor Sharon Rosner and Itay Jedlin who performed it with Le Concert Étranger at the 2015 Ambronay Festival, concert filmed by French national television.

Wilson-Dickson (2016)
In 2016, composer and conductor Andrew Wilson-Dickson made a new stylistically coherent reconstruction using BWV 198, 7, 54 and 171, and newly composed music for the missing recitatives and turba choruses. The work was premiered by the Welsh Camerata and Welsh Baroque Orchestra at the Royal Welsh College of Music & Drama, Cardiff, on Good Friday, 2016.

Fischer (2016)
In 2015, church musician Andreas Fischer reconstructed the Markus Passion by parodying only works by Bach. He paid attention to the proximity of text and music and avoided using music from the known passions, so as not to produce a "small" St. Matthew Passion. Ortus (Berlin, Germany) published this work in the year 2016.

Savall (2018)

On 30 March 2018, Jordi Savall produced a reconstruction which aired on BBC Radio 3.

References

Further reading 
 Bärenreiter. "St. Mark Passion BWV 247."  www.baerenreiter.com
 Butt, John.  "Reconstructing Bach."  Early Music. November 1998, 673–675.
 Carus-Verlag. "Markuspassion." www.carus-verlag.com
 Koopman, Ton.  "Research." www.tonkoopman.nl
 Neumann, Werner.  Sämtliche von Johann Sebastian Bach vertonte Texte.  Leipzig: VEB D eutscher Verlag für Musik, 1974.
 Melamed, Daniel R.  Hearing Bach's Passions.  "Parody and Reconstruction: the Saint Mark Passion BWV 247."  New York: Oxford University Press, 2005.
 Terry, Charles Sanford. Bach: The Cantatas and Oratorios, the Passions, the Magnificat, Lutheran Masses, and Motets.  Five volumes in one. New York: Johnson Reprint Corporation, 1972.
 Theill, Gustav Adolf. Die Markuspassion von Joh. Seb. Bach (BWV 247).  Steinfeld : Salvator, 1978.

External links 
 Speculations Regarding the Original Liturgical Occasions of the Individual BWV 253–438 Chorales § St. Mark Passion (BWV 247) Speculations at 
 Markus-Passion BWV 247 on bach-cantatas.com
 

Passions and oratorios by Johann Sebastian Bach
Lost musical works by Johann Sebastian Bach
1731 compositions
1744 compositions